Anaciaeschna martini, is a species of dragonfly in the family Aeshnidae. It is found in Japan, India, Sri Lanka, and recently from Nepal.

Description and habitat
Sélys described this species in 1897 from Yokohama, Japan. Fraser described Anaciaeschna donaldi from specimens collected from Kodaikanal, Yercaud and Ooty. It flies at dusk and breeds in still water in the lakes. Its eyes are dark olivaceous brown, prothorax is dark brown, and thorax is maroon with apple green marks. Its abdomen is dark brown with apple green mark on first three segments and pale yellowish brown marks on the sides of segments four to seven.

There are no significant in morphological or molecular genetic differences between A. donaldi and A. martini; therefore it is concluded that A. donaldi is a junior synonym of A. martini.

See also
 List of odonates of India
 List of odonates of Sri Lanka
 List of odonata of Kerala

References

 Query Results
 Animal diversity web

Aeshnidae
Insects described in 1897
Taxa named by Edmond de Sélys Longchamps